List of aircraft of the Israeli Air Force:

Fixed wing combat types

Fixed wing auxiliary

Fixed wing trainers

Rotary wing - helicopters

Unmanned aerial vehicles

Captured / defected aircraft

References

Bibliography
 Wisker Thomas J. "Talkback". Air Enthusiast, No. 10, July–September 1979, p. 79. 

Israeli Air Force
Israeli military-related lists
Israeli Air Force Aircraft